Micheline Coulombe Saint-Marcoux (9 August 1938 – 2 February 1985) was a Canadian composer and music educator who played an important role in the contemporary classical music scene of Canada and France from the late 1960s through the mid-1980s. An associate of the Canadian Music Centre, she was commissioned to write works by the Montreal Symphony Orchestra, the Canadian Broadcast Corporation, and the Quebec Contemporary Music Society.

Life and career
Born in La Doré, Quebec, Saint-Marcoux studied at the École de musique Vincent-d'Indy, the Conservatoire de musique du Québec à Montréal (CMQM), and the Conservatoire de Paris. Her teachers included Gilbert Amy, Françoise Aubut, François Brassard, Claude Champagne, Jean-Pierre Guézec, Yvonne Hubert, Clermont Pépin, Pierre Schaeffer, and Gilles Tremblay. In 1967 she was awarded the Prix d'Europe for composition with Modulaire for orchestra. In 1969 she co-founded the Groupe international de musique électroacoustique de Paris and in 1971 she was a co-founder of the Montréal percussion group Ensemble Polycousmie. From 1971 until her death in Montréal in 1984 she taught on the faculty of the CMQM.

References

1938 births
1985 deaths
Conservatoire de Paris alumni
Conservatoire de musique du Québec à Montréal alumni
Academic staff of the Conservatoire de musique du Québec à Montréal
École de musique Vincent-d'Indy alumni
Canadian music educators
Musicians from Quebec
20th-century Canadian composers
Canadian women in electronic music
Women music educators
20th-century Canadian women musicians
20th-century classical composers